Sunnybrook Park is a large public park in Toronto, Ontario, Canada. It is located north of Leaside and south of the Bridle Path areas of the city. The park is home to many bike trails, dog parks, and Sunnybrook Stables.

History
Sunnybrook was once a 175-acre farm property with horse stables, known as Sunnybrook Farm, situated in the Town of Leaside. It was owned by Joseph and Alice Kilgour and turned over to the City of Toronto in 1928.

Kilgour was President of the Canada Paper Company and acquired the farm in 1890s.

In 1933 Kilgour Memorial Gates at Bayview Avenue and Blythwood Road (since demolished) as well as a plaque at Wilket Creek Park were added to commemorate the Kilgour family's legacy and presence in the area.

Stables 

Sunnybrook Stables is a horseback riding facility that has been open to the public since 1978. The stables house roughly thirty horses, accompanied by two arenas: a 12,000 square-foot indoor arena built in 1982 for year-round practice, as well as an outdoor arena that also serves as a paddock. Just behind the indoor arena are three other paddocks, also used for the horses to roam when they're not in their stalls.

Fire in 2018 
On 21 May 2018, right before 3 am ET, Sunnybrook Stables caught on fire and became engulfed in flames, killing 16 of the 29 horses in the stable. A barn near Sunnybrook Stables also caught on fire. The cause of the fire is unknown, although the Ontario Fire Marshal suspected that the fire was caused by fireworks reported in the area of Sunnybrook Stables both on the night of 20 May and the early morning of 21 May.

Cricket
Sunnybrook hosted a first-class cricket fixture in 2004. The Canada national cricket team used the ground for their ICC Intercontinental Cup match against Bermuda, which ended in a draw with Canada requiring only one further wicket to win.

The ground also hosted six matches during the 2001 ICC Trophy.

References

External links

 Official website
 Sunnybrook Farm – Lost Rivers

Cricket grounds in Toronto
Sports venues in Toronto
Parks in Toronto
Dog parks in Canada